The Problem Solvers Caucus is a bipartisan group in the United States House of Representatives that includes members equally divided between Democrats and Republicans, who seek to foster bipartisan cooperation on key policy issues. The group was created in January 2017 as an outgrowth of meetings held by political organization No Labels starting in 2014. It is currently co-chaired by Josh Gottheimer (D-NJ) and Brian Fitzpatrick (R-PA).

History 

The Problem Solvers Caucus developed over time as an outgrowth of informal meetings organized by the political reform group No Labels. No Labels spent years on Capitol Hill working to get members in a room to talk with colleagues from the other party. These informal "get to know you" meetings led to more substantive cooperation across the aisle, including the introduction of nine bipartisan bills to reduce government waste and inefficiency, and the passage of the No Budget, No Pay Act of 2013 and the Medicare "doc fix" in 2015.

Over time, No Labels continued to organize members into a more cohesive group and eventually branded the group the "Problem Solvers" and recruited its first two co-chairs, Rep. Reid Ribble (R-WI) and Rep. Kurt Schrader (D-OR). This group of members organized by No Labels also signed a resolution (H.R. 207) calling for both parties to unify behind a National Strategic Agenda with four goals focused on: job creation, balancing the budget, securing Medicare and Social Security, and energy security.

The early iteration of the Problem Solvers group was promising, but it lacked the cohesion of groups on the left and right like the Progressive Caucus and Freedom Caucus. That began to change at the outset of 115th Congress when the Problem Solvers registered as an independent member-driven Caucus.

Writing in The New York Times about the Problem Solvers Caucus, then co-chairs Reed and Gottheimer said: "We all knew the partisanship in Washington had gotten out of control and felt the need to create a bipartisan group committed to getting to 'yes' on important issues. We have agreed to vote together for any policy proposal that garners the support of 75 percent of the entire Problem Solvers Caucus, as well as 51 percent of both the Democrats and Republicans in the caucus."

Today, the Problem Solvers Caucus is co-chaired by Rep. Josh Gottheimer (D-NJ) and Rep. Brian Fitzpatrick (R-PA), and counts 63 members evenly divided between the parties, who are working to forge bipartisan solutions to America's toughest challenges.

Healthcare reform 
During the week of August 4, 2017, the 43-member House Problem Solvers Caucus released a compromise to shore up the struggling insurance exchanges. The proposal focused on the skyrocketing cost of individual health insurance premiums. At the time, the Trump administration considered suspending cost-sharing payments that defray out-of-pocket payments like deductibles and co-payments, a move which insurers said could cause premiums to rise by 15 percent or more.

The second part of the Problem Solvers plan would have provided relief to help states deal with the high cost of pre-existing and chronic conditions. The relief is provided through a dedicated stability fund that states could use to reduce premiums and limit losses for providing coverage for these high-cost patients. The third part of the plan provides relief to certain businesses from the mandate that they provide insurance to full-time employees. It also defines "full time" as a 40-hour workweek to discourage businesses from manipulating employees' weekly hours to skirt the mandate.

The plan would have also eliminated the Medical Device Tax, an excise charge of 2.3 percent, which opponents claim is passed onto consumers and reduces funds for research and development.

Congressional rules reform 
After the 2018 Midterm elections, the Problem Solvers Caucus and House Democratic Leadership negotiated a package that reformed the rules of the House. The initiative, entitled "Break the Gridlock", gives bipartisan ideas a fair hearing on the House floor and encourages legislation through compromise.

COVID-19 relief 
In September 2020, the Problem Solvers released their "March to Common Ground" COVID-19 relief package, an outline for a Congressional bi-partisan compromise that showed that members of both parties were willing to listen to each other in order to craft legislation.

Capitol riot and reaction 
On May 18, 2021, the Problem Solvers Caucus endorsed bipartisan legislation to investigate the attack on the Capitol. However, the next day only 18 of 28 Republican Problem Solvers voted in support of creating a bipartisan commission to lead the investigation.

List of co-chairs

Membership 

This group includes 63 members: 32 Democrats and 31 Republicans.

Democrats 

Salud Carbajal of California
Ed Case of Hawaii
Jim Costa of California
Angie Craig of Minnesota
Henry Cuellar of Texas
Don Davis of North Carolina
Debbie Dingell of Michigan
Marie Gluesenkamp Perez of Washington
Jared Golden of Maine
Josh Gottheimer of New Jersey
Josh Harder of California
Steven Horsford of Nevada
Chrissy Houlahan of Pennsylvania
Dan Kildee of Michigan
Greg Landsman of Ohio
Susie Lee of Nevada
Wiley Nickel of North Carolina
Donald Norcross of New Jersey
Jimmy Panetta of California
Chris Pappas of New Hampshire
Scott Peters of California
Brittany Pettersen of Colorado
Dean Phillips of Minnesota
Mary Peltola of Alaska
Brad Schneider of Illinois
Hillary Scholten of Michigan
Elissa Slotkin of Michigan
Darren Soto of Florida
Abigail Spanberger of Virginia           
Haley Stevens of Michigan
Emilia Strong Sykes of Ohio
David Trone of Maryland

Republicans 

 Don Bacon of Nebraska
 Lori Chavez-DeRemer of Oregon
 Juan Ciscomani of Arizona
 Ben Cline of Virginia
 John Curtis of Utah
 Anthony D'Esposito of New York
 Chuck Edwards of North Carolina
 Brian Fitzpatrick of Pennsylvania 
 Mike Gallagher of Wisconsin
 Andrew Garbarino of New York
 Tony Gonzales of Texas
 Jenniffer Gonzalez of Puerto Rico
 John James of Michigan 
 Bill Johnson of Ohio
 Dusty Johnson of South Dakota
 David Joyce of Ohio
 Thomas Kean Jr. of New Jersey
 Young Kim of California
 Nick LaLota of New York
 Mike Lawler of New York
 Nancy Mace of South Carolina
 Nicole Malliotakis of New York
 Daniel Meuser of Pennsylvania
 Marc Molinaro of New York
 Blake Moore of Utah
 James Moylan of Guam
 Maria Elvira Salazar of Florida
 Chris Smith of New Jersey
 Bryan Steil of Wisconsin
 David Valadao of California
 Brandon Williams of New York

Former members

Democrats 
Anthony Brindisi of New York (lost reelection in 2020)
Carolyn Bourdeaux of Georgia (lost renomination in 2022 due to redistricting)
Lou Correa of California (remains in office)
Joe Cunningham of South Carolina (lost reelection in 2020)
 Elizabeth Esty of Connecticut (did not seek reelection in 2018)
Vincente Gonzalez of Texas (remains in office)
Kendra Horn of Oklahoma (lost reelection in 2020)
Conor Lamb of Pennsylvania (did not seek reelection in 2022)
Daniel Lipinski of Illinois (lost Democratic nomination in 2020)
Elaine Luria of Virginia (lost reelection in 2022)
Tom Malinowski of New Jersey (lost reelection in 2022)
Ben McAdams of Utah (lost reelection in 2020)
Stephanie Murphy of Florida (did not seek reelection in 2022)
 Richard Nolan of Minnesota (did not seek reelection in 2018)
Tom O'Halleran of Arizona (lost reelection in 2022)
 Jared Polis of Colorado (elected Governor of Colorado in 2018)
 Jacky Rosen of Nevada (elected to United States Senate in 2018)
Max Rose of New York (lost reelection in 2020)
Kurt Schrader of Oregon (lost renomination in 2022)
 Kyrsten Sinema of Arizona (elected to United States Senate in 2018)
Tom Suozzi of New York (did not seek reelection in 2022)
 Peter Welch of Vermont (elected to United States Senate in 2022)

Republicans 

 Mark Amodei of Nevada (remains in office)
 Mike Bost of Illinois (remains in office)
 Mike Coffman of Colorado (lost reelection in 2018)
 Ryan Costello of Pennsylvania (did not seek reelection in 2018)
 Carlos Curbelo of Florida (lost reelection in 2018)
 Charlie Dent of Pennsylvania (resigned in 2018)
 John Faso of New York (lost reelection in 2018)
 Anthony Gonzalez of Ohio (did not seek reelection in 2022)
 Jaime Herrera Beutler of Washington (lost renomination in 2022)
 Will Hurd of Texas (did not seek reelection in 2020)
 Lynn Jenkins of Kansas (did not seek reelection in 2018)
 John Katko of New York (did not seek reelection in 2022)
 Tom MacArthur of New Jersey (lost reelection in 2018)
 Patrick Meehan of Pennsylvania (resigned in 2018)
 Peter Meijer of Michigan (lost renomination in 2022)
 Tom Reed of New York (resigned in 2022)
 Tom Rice of South Carolina (lost renomination in 2022)
 Illeana Ros Lehtinen of Florida (did not seek reelection in 2018)
 Pete Stauber of Minnesota (remains in office)
 Van Taylor of Texas (did not seek reelection in 2022)
 Glenn Thompson of Pennsylvania (Remains in office. Previously a member, but uncertain current membership status.)
 Dave Trott of Michigan (did not seek reelection in 2018)
 Fred Upton of Michigan (did not seek reelection in 2022)
 Steve Watkins of Kansas (lost Republican nomination in 2020)
 David Young of Iowa (lost reelection in 2018)

Media coverage 
The Problem Solvers Caucus has been finding itself in the middle of several key battles and is "proving to be a force on Capitol Hill, one that's willing to leave some bruises in its wake but also to make common cause with its natural Senate allies".

Mark Pocan, a former caucus member and co-chair of the Congressional Progressive Caucus, a left-leaning organization, says he was "duped" by No Labels and the PSC, saying that rather than "breaking gridlock", it is "a fast track for special interests and lobbyists."

Notes

References

Caucuses of the United States Congress
Centrism in the United States